3rd FFCC Awards 
January 12, 1999

Best Film:
 Shakespeare in Love 
The 3rd Florida Film Critics Circle Awards, given on 12 January 1999, honored the best in film for 1998.

Winners
Best Actor: 
Ian McKellen - Apt Pupil and Gods and Monsters
Best Actress: 
Gwyneth Paltrow - Shakespeare in Love and Sliding Doors
Best Cinematography: 
Saving Private Ryan - Janusz Kamiński
Best Director: 
Peter Weir  The Truman Show
Best Film: 
Shakespeare in Love
Best Foreign Language Film: 
Life is Beautiful (La vita è bella) • Italy
Best Newcomer (tie): 
Darren Aronofsky - Pi
Chris Eyre and Sherman Alexie - Smoke Signals
Best Screenplay: 
Shakespeare in Love - Marc Norman and Tom Stoppard
Best Supporting Actor: 
Robert Duvall - A Civil Action
Best Supporting Actress: 
Christina Ricci - Buffalo '66, The Opposite of Sex, and Pecker
Special Notice to 1998 animation features: 
Antz, A Bug's Life, Mulan, and The Prince of Egypt

1
1998 film awards